Kosara or Cossara (Bulgarian and ) was a Bulgarian noblewoman, related to Tsar Samuel of Bulgaria, who was married to Prince Jovan Vladimir of Duklja.

Origin and identity 
The 11th-century Byzantine historian John Skylitzes calls her a daughter of Tsar Samuil of Bulgaria, but the annotations to Skylitzes of Michael of Duklja correct this by interpolating that her father was called Theodoretos. B. Prokić, the first editor of the manuscript (Codex Vindobonensis hist. gr. 74) that contains the annotations, mistranslated the note and emended the father's name to Theodora, thereby giving Kosara the name Theodora Kosara by which she is often known in modern scholarly literature. Modern scholarship suggests that the otherwise unattested Theodoretos may have been the son of John Chryselios, magnate of Dyrrhachium and Samuel's father-in-law.

Life 
Kosara was married ca. 1000 with Jovan Vladimir, Prince of Duklja, who had been defeated and taken prisoner of Tsar Samuel. An oral tradition recorded in the 12th-century in the Chronicle of the Priest of Duklja turns the marriage into a romantic tale of Kosara visiting Vladimir in his prison cell, eventually falling in love and asking to be married to him.

The story of Vladimir and Kosara is the subject of one of the most romantic tales of early Montenegrin literature; this is the Chronicle’s description of how Vladimir and Kosara met:

So Kosara fell in love with the handsome captive, and begged her father for his hand. Samuel, having conquered lands, wanted to bind his new subjects to himself in a more cordial way, not only with the sheer force. He allowed the marriage, returned Duklja to his new son-in-law, and besides gave him the whole territory of Dyrrhachium, to rule them from that point on as his vassal.

Kosara and Jovan Vladimir had a daughter, who married Stefan Vojislav, prince of Zeta.

Tsar Samuel died in 1014 and he was succeeded by his son Gavril Radomir, but his reign was short: his cousin Ivan Vladislav killed him in 1015, and ruled in his stead. Vladislav held that he would make his position stronger if he exterminated the whole family of Samuil, for which reason he plotted the murder of Jovan Vladimir. The new Tsar thus sent messengers to him to demand his attendance in Prespa, but Vladimir did not want to go out his land; not even after many subsequent Vladislav’s promises and pledges that he meant no harm to him. Finally, Vladislav sent him a golden cross with his pledge on it, to which Vladimir replied:

Two bishops and a hermit came to Vladimir, gave him a wooden cross, and confirmed that the Tsar had made the pledge on it. Vladimir kissed the cross, collected a few followers, and set off to Prespa. As soon as he arrived there, he went into a church for a prayer. When he came out of the church, he was struck down by Vladislav’s soldiers and beheaded, all the time holding the cross in his hands; it was May 22, 1016.

Jovan Vladimir was buried in Prespa, in the same church in front of which he was martyred. Shortly after his death, he was recognized as a martyr and saint.

Two or three years after Jovan Vladimir’s burial, Kosara transported his remains to Duklja. She interred him near his court in Krajina, in the church of Monastery of the Most Holy Theotokos. Kosara did not marry again; by her will, she was interred in the same church, at the feet of her husband.

References

Sources

Bulgarian princesses
10th-century births
11th-century deaths
10th-century Bulgarian people
11th-century Bulgarian people
10th-century Bulgarian women
11th-century Bulgarian women

Cometopuli dynasty